Noni Ioannidou (Greek: Νόνη Ιωαννίδου) (born 15 April 1958) is a Greek theatre and stage actress and model, that recently switched to television roles. She is best known for Antigoni in the 1992 television series Vammena kokkina mallia, as Aggela Solomou on 17 episodes of Me thea sto pelago and for playing Vera Douka on the first two seasons of Erotas.

Career

Filmography

Film

Television

References 

Greek National Theatre database
Eleftherotypia newspaper article

External links 
 

1958 births
Living people
Greek television actresses
Greek film actresses
Greek stage actresses
Greek female models
Actresses from Athens